Mati Alaver (born 21 February 1954 in Võru) is a former Estonian skier and sport coach.

1981–1992 he was the main coach of Estonian women cross-country national team, and 1992–2011 the main coach of Estonian cross-country skiing.

His most notable students are Andrus Veerpalu and Jaak Mae.

In 2019 he was related to the doping scandal Operation Aderlass.

Awards
 1999, 2001–2003 and 2009: best coach of Estonia
 2001: Order of the Estonian Red Cross, IV class. In 2019, the award was taken off due to the doping scandal
 2003: International Olympic Committee's yearly award "Sporting Excellence"
 2006: Order of the White Star, III class. In 2019, the award was taken off due to the doping scandal

References

Living people
1954 births
Estonian sports coaches
University of Tartu alumni
Academic staff of the University of Tartu
Sportspeople from Võru